The Salvador Metro (Brazilian Portuguese: Metrô de Salvador, commonly called Metrô or Sistema Metropolitano Salvador-Lauro de Freitas) is a rapid transit system serving Salvador city, the state capital of Bahia and the fourth largest city in Brazil. The current system includes a fully open 33 km and twenty, which began partial public service on June 11, 2014. The system arrives until the center of the city of Lauro de Freitas also. It is operated by CCR METRÔ BAHIA Company.

Additionally, Salvador is served by a   railway line known as the Suburban Line (Calçada-Paripe) that does not connect with the Metro. This suburban line will soon become a VLT line integrated to the 43 km of the subway of Salvador.

The construction of the SMSL is carried out in an expansion divided in six stages that will integrate the traditional center of the city until Pirajá (later, until the district of Águas Claras, near Cajazeiras), and until the neighboring municipality of Lauro de Freitas through Line 1 and Line 2 respectively, totaling 41.8 kilometers (17.6 of Line 1 and 24.2 of Line 2) and 22 stations.

As part of the efforts to implement integrated transportation in Greater Salvador, the subway assumes the role of structural trunk system, while the others must be complementary and feeder. Therefore, according to the requirement of integration put in the edict of the subway bidding of 2013, the subway is planned to coordinate with other related modalities: the Suburb Train, which currently operates with 13.5 kilometers of extension and 10 stations and must be replaced by the SkyRail Bahia monorail line, with the Blue Line and Red Line, which are transverse feeder roads in deployment to be covered by a Bus Rapid Transit System (BRT), with conventional Soteropolitan municipal bus lines, of Laurofreitenses municipal buses and with the metropolitan ones.

Background

The project is a Build, Operate, and Transfer (BOT) scheme for the operation of the urban rapid rail transportation system in the municipality of Salvador da Bahia, and includes the supply and installation of rolling stock and signaling equipment, and commercial operation of the system for the 25-year concession. Each train, consisting of four cars, has the capacity to carry 1,250 passengers.

Currently, the urban transportation system in Salvador is underdeveloped and largely road-based, causing significant congestion and delays. This level of road-based transport has significant impacts on the local economy and environment. For this reason the municipality and the state, together with the World Bank, have been involved since 1992 in the design and implementation of a transportation strategy. The international standard gauge is 3 kV overhead power supply. And Built by a consortium of Siemens and Camargo Corrêa and Andrade Gutierrez of Brazil.

This project is an integral part of the strategy that aims to improve the quality of public urban transportation in the area by connecting currently excluded low-income neighborhoods, and by furthering the development of a fully integrated urban transportation system.

Salvador Metro system is one of the systems of urban mobility that were deployed for the 2014 FIFA World Cup. The connection of Line 2 with Line 1 of Salvador Metro contributes to connect the International Airport to Downtown Salvador and the Fonte Nova Stadium. The new Line 2 of Salvador Metro integrates the metro stations of the Rótula do Abacaxi and the beach city of Lauro de Freitas in the metropolitan area, passing through the Salvador International Airport, with the Airport metro station.

Operations

Route

Brotas station (which serves the Itaipava Arena Fonte Nova stadium) is elevated, while Accesso Norte Station and Retiro stations are at-grade.

Stations

The following lists the current, and planned, stations of the Salvador Metro, by their opening date:

Gallery

Network map

See also
 List of metro systems
 Rapid transit in Brazil

References

External links

 CCR Metrô Bahia – official website 
 Transalvador  
 Salvador at UrbanRail.net

Metro
Rapid transit in Brazil
Electric railways in Brazil
Underground rapid transit in Brazil
3000 V DC railway electrification